Berlin Südkreuz station is a railway station in the German capital Berlin. The station was originally opened in 1898 and is an interchange station. The Berlin Ringbahn line of the Berlin S-Bahn metro railway is situated on the upper level and connects to the east and west, whilst the Anhalter Bahn and Dresdner Bahn intercity railway routes reach the station on the lower, north-south level. The station was extensively rebuilt between the late 1990s and 2006, and was renamed Berlin Südkreuz on 28 May 2006.

History 

The station's original name (Berlin Papestraße) originates from the nearby General-Pape-Straße, which is named after the Prussian general Alexander August Wilhelm von Pape. The Ringbahn platform opened as an island platform on 1 December 1901.

The original Papestrasse station building, constructed from 1898-1901 was demolished, although a corner of the building, incorporating a clock tower, has been preserved as part of the new station.

Becoming Südkreuz 
The station played a vital part in Deutsche Bahn's new concept for long-distance services in Berlin; it was deemed necessary to have a long-distance station in southern Berlin for the new north-south axis, so it was decided to rebuild Papestraße and rename the station to Südkreuz, giving the station a more intuitive name like the Ostkreuz (East Cross) and Westkreuz (West Cross) stations on the Berlin Stadtbahn. Construction, however, was severely delayed due to unexpected difficulties and NIMBY complaints of residents living near the long-disused north-south lines. Instead of opening in 2000 as scheduled, the station only opened on 28 May 2006, together with the new Berlin Hauptbahnhof (Berlin Main Station) in the center of Berlin. It is now used as a terminal station for ICE trains to Hamburg Hauptbahnhof, and sees a number of north-south services heading to and from Leipzig Hauptbahnhof, plus EuroCity services to the Czech Republic, Hungary and Slovakia via Dresden Hauptbahnhof.

Facial recognition trial
During 2017 Germany's Ministry of the Interior announced a pilot project to employ facial recognition technology at Berlin Südkreuz station. The six-month trial will overlay facial recognition software over the station's existing video surveillance system and will track a database of volunteers. The project is being jointly undertaken by the Ministry of the Interior, the Federal Police, the Federal Criminal Police Office and Deutsche Bahn.
Announcing the pilot, the ministry said the technology would be able to detect people in need of help, as well as suspicious behaviour, and report it automatically.

Train services
The station is served by the following service(s):

Long distance

Regional

S-Bahn 
Berlin S-Bahn services  Bernau - Karow - Pankow - Gesundbrunnen - Friedrichstraße - Potsdamer Platz - Südkreuz - Blankenfelde
Berlin S-Bahn services  Hennigsdorf - Tegel - Gesundbrunnen - Friedrichstraße - Potsdamer Platz - Südkreuz - Lichterfelde - Teltow
Berlin S-Bahn services  Waidmannslust - Wittenau - Gesundbrunnen - Friedrichstraße - Potsdamer Platz - Südkreuz - Lichterfelde - Teltow
Berlin S-Bahn services  (Ring Clockwise) Südkreuz - Innsbrucker Platz - Westkreuz - Westend - Jungfernheide - Gesundbrunnen - Ostkreuz - Treptower Park - Hermannstraße - Südkreuz
Berlin S-Bahn services  (Ring Anti-clockwise) Südkreuz - Hermannstraße - Treptower Park - Ostkreuz - Gesundbrunnen - Jungfernheide - Westend - Westkreuz - Innsbrucker Platz - Südkreuz
Berlin S-Bahn services  Südkreuz - Neukölln - Schöneweide - Berlin-Brandenburg Airport (T1-T2)
Berlin S-Bahn services  Westend - Westkreuz - Innsbrucker Platz - Südkreuz - Neukölln - Schöneweide - Grünau - Königs Wusterhausen

References

External links

Buildings and structures in Tempelhof-Schöneberg
Railway stations in Berlin
Berlin S-Bahn stations
Railway stations in Germany opened in 1898